Henry Hammond (1605–1660) was an English churchman.

Henry Hammond may also refer to:

Henry Hammond (footballer, born 1866) (1866–1910), English footballer
Henry Hammond (Australian footballer) (1881–1961), Australian rules footballer
Henry Hammond (American football) (1913–2004), football player for the Chicago Bears
Henry Hammond, fictional character in Louisa

See also

Harry Hammond (disambiguation)